Nikolaos Triantafyllopoulos (10 January 1918 – 1998) was a Greek sports shooter. He competed in the 50 metre rifle, three positions and 50 metre rifle, prone events at the 1960 Summer Olympics.

References

External links
 

1918 births
1998 deaths
Greek male sport shooters
Olympic shooters of Greece
Shooters at the 1960 Summer Olympics
People from Messenia
Sportspeople from the Peloponnese
20th-century Greek people